Who Do You Believe? is an American true crime documentary series which tells a story from dual perspectives. The show tells two contrasting/competing narratives of a story from the victim and criminals involved.  The show premiered on May 3, 2022 on ABC. The show is narrated by Mia Bankston.

Production
On March 10, 2022, it was announced that ABC had ordered the series. On March 15, 2022, it was announced that the series would premiere on May 3, 2022.

Format
The show takes a new twist on the "Whodunit" approach, asking the viewer to pick who they believe is telling the truth. Putting the viewer in the seat of judge/jury on the case presented. Each hour episode follows one case told from both the side of the victim and criminals without stating who is the guilty party to start with.

Episodes

References

External links

2020s American documentary television series
2022 American television series debuts
American Broadcasting Company original programming
English-language television shows
True crime television series
Television series by All3Media